Nanoscale Research Letters is a peer-reviewed open access scientific journal covering research in all areas of nanotechnology and published by Springer Science+Business Media.

External links 
 

Springer Science+Business Media academic journals
Monthly journals
Publications established in 2006
Nanotechnology journals
English-language journals
Open access journals